Jacob Frankenfield (July 7, 1838 – August 31, 1914) was an American businessman and politician who served in the Minnesota Senate from 1874 to 1875 and Los Angeles City Council from 1885 to 1890. He was the President of the Los Angeles City Council for a year, and during his tenure helped with the building of the Los Angeles City Hall and helped change the name of Fort Street to Broadway.

Early life 
Frankenfield was born on August 7, 1838 in Bucks County, Pennsylvania. In 1855, he moved to Henderson, Minnesota and married Jeannie Fulmer in 1864.

Career 
Frankenfield started his political career in Henderson, being elected the Mayor of Henderson and Sheriff of Sibley County, later being elected to the Minnesota Senate in 1870. In 1875, President Ulysses S. Grant appointed Frankenfield to the Collector of Customs for the district of Minnesota, which he held until 1879. 

In 1892, he was on the opposition ticket for the fourth ward as a Republican. In 1883, he came to Los Angeles and was elected to the Los Angeles Common Council for the 5th ward, taking office in 1885. In 1889, he was elected as the President of the Los Angeles City Council before retiring in 1895. During his tenure, he helped with the beginning of the new Los Angeles City Hall at the corner of Second Street and Spring Street, with excavations happening under his watch.

After the City Council, he went into business but was a fire commissioner for a brief time.  In 1900, Frankenfield was elected to the Los Angeles Board of Freeholders.

Personal life and death 
He and his wife Jeanette Fuller had three children, two girls and one boy. Frankenfield died on August 31, 1914 at his family residence in South Park. His funeral was held on September 3, 1914 with many Los Angeles pioneers attending his funeral; he was buried in Evergreen Cemetery.

References 

1838 births
1914 deaths
Los Angeles City Council members
California Republicans
Minnesota Republicans
Minnesota state senators